Javier Jesús Méndez Henríquez (born 6 June 1949) is a Chilean former footballer who played as a forward.

Career
At club level, he played for Unión Española, Naval, Coquimbo Unido, Aviación, Huachipato and Wolfsberger AC.

He played in four matches for the Chile national football team from 1974 to 1975.  
He was also part of Chile's squad for the 1975 Copa América tournament.

Personal life
He is the younger brother of Eugenio Méndez, who is also a Chilean former international footballer.

Honours
Chile
 Copa Acosta Ñu: 1974

References

External links
 

1949 births
Living people
Sportspeople from Valparaíso
Chilean footballers
Chilean expatriate footballers
Chile international footballers
Unión Española footballers
Naval de Talcahuano footballers
Coquimbo Unido footballers
C.D. Aviación footballers
C.D. Huachipato footballers
Wolfsberger AC players
Chilean Primera División players
Primera B de Chile players
2. Liga (Austria) players
chilean expatriate sportspeople in Austria
Expatriate footballers in Austria
1975 Copa América players
Association football midfielders